Benjamin Gibbard (born August 11, 1976) is an American singer, songwriter and guitarist. He is best known as the lead vocalist and guitarist of the indie rock band Death Cab for Cutie, with whom he has recorded ten studio albums, and as a member of the indie pop band The Postal Service. Gibbard released his debut solo album, Former Lives, in 2012, and a collaborative studio album, One Fast Move or I'm Gone (2009) with Jay Farrar.

Early life
Gibbard was born to Allen and Margaret (née Flach) Gibbard in Bremerton, Washington. His father was in the Navy and his family moved around the country, including spending time in Northern Virginia before returning to Washington. Gibbard spent his early life there during the grunge music explosion of the early 1990s. He graduated from Olympic High School in Bremerton in 1994, and studied environmental chemistry at Western Washington University. He was raised Catholic and in 2007 referred to himself as an "indoctrinated Catholic even though I haven't been to church of my own volition in 10 or 15 years now."

Career 
In 1996, while playing guitar in the band Pinwheel, Gibbard recorded a demo cassette under the moniker Death Cab for Cutie, titled You Can Play These Songs with Chords (1997). After receiving a positive response to the material, Gibbard expanded the project into a full band, with the addition of guitarist Chris Walla, bassist Nick Harmer and drummer Nathan Good. The following year, the band released its debut album, Something About Airplanes (1998), on Barsuk Records, and released its follow-up, We Have the Facts and We're Voting Yes, in 2000.

Gibbard had a minor role in the John Krasinski film Brief Interviews with Hideous Men based on the David Foster Wallace short story collection of the same title. He completed a solo tour through the US in the spring of 2007 that featured David Bazan of Pedro the Lion and singer-songwriter Johnathan Rice.

In November 2014, Gibbard appeared as a guest on Foo Fighters' eighth studio album Sonic Highways.

Personal life 
Gibbard became engaged to actress and musician Zooey Deschanel in 2008 and married in September 2009 near Seattle. They announced their separation on November 1, 2011, with Deschanel filing for divorce on December 27, citing irreconcilable differences. The divorce was finalized on December 12, 2012. Gibbard later married photographer and tour manager Rachel Demy on October 21, 2016 in Seattle.

In a 2003 interview, Gibbard stated that while he had previously been a vegan, he recently became a pescetarian. He reportedly gave up alcohol in 2008 and began running marathons. He ran his first trail ultramarathon in 2013 and has since completed several each year.

Gibbard is a lapsed Catholic who now identifies as agnostic: "I don't want to falsely believe in something solely so I can jump to the front of the line for whatever this awesome place is we go after we die. [...] The vastness of that idea is so beyond my comprehension that I feel like if there was a God, then that God would accept me saying I'm not able to believe because it's so outside of my ability to understand it. I understand that's where faith comes into play."

Gibbard has been a fan of the MLB's Seattle Mariners since the age of five and has thrown the first pitch at two Mariners games. When the Mariners traded Ichiro Suzuki to the New York Yankees in 2012, Gibbard honored him by writing and releasing the song "Ichiro's Theme". Gibbard's handwritten lyrics for the song are currently in the archive of the National Baseball Hall of Fame and Museum in Cooperstown, New York.

Politics 
Gibbard is an activist for gay rights and wrote an article in The Daily Beast explaining why the issue is important to him. He stated that when his lesbian sister got married, it was "the most beautiful thing" he ever saw. In the article, he voiced his support for Washington Referendum 74 and discussed raising money for the issue. He stated, "I would just feel so much pride for my state if we could pass it by a popular vote and show the rest of the country that this is the direction we are going in."

Gibbard has been open about his political views, expressing his support of the Democratic Party. On October 10, 2016, Death Cab for Cutie released "Million Dollar Loan", the first song in the Dave Eggers project, 30 Days, 50 Songs. The song targets Donald Trump as it satirizes the fact he asked his father for a million dollar loan. Gibbard said of the song: "Lyrically, 'Million Dollar Loan' deals with a particularly tone deaf moment in Donald Trump's ascent to the Republican nomination. While campaigning in New Hampshire last year, he attempted to cast himself as a self-made man by claiming he built his fortune with just a 'small loan of a million dollars' from his father. Not only has this statement been proven to be wildly untrue, he was so flippant about it. It truly disgusted me."

During the COVID-19 pandemic, Gibbard live streamed daily concerts from his home after canceling shows due to the pandemic. Gibbard played songs by his bands Death Cab for Cutie and The Postal Service and other artists such as the Decemberists, Radiohead, New Order, Depeche Mode and the Beatles while promoting local Washington non-profit organizations.

Musical equipment 
As of May 2015, Gibbard tours with four modified 1970s Fender Mustang guitars. Additionally, he uses two custom-built Acme Silvertone amplifier heads. For use on acoustic songs, he relies on two 2008 Gibson J-45 Acoustic Guitars with B-Band pickup systems. As of 2016, Gibbard has since began using Supro amplifiers. In the past, Gibbard played 1980s Japanese-built Squier Bullets through a Sears Silvertone amp, which he immortalized in the lyrics to the song No Joy In Mudville. He also used Fender Telecasters and G&L ASAT guitars.

In January 2021, Fender announced the Ben Gibbard Mustang as part of their Artist Signature series, designed to Ben's specifications and inspired by the 1970s Mustangs he uses on tour. The guitar features several unique features including a chambered ash body, custom "Ben Gibbard" pickups, and simplified electronics.

In popular culture
Gibbard is the subject of the song "Ben's My Friend" by indie folk act Sun Kil Moon. The track appears on the project's sixth studio album, Benji (2014). On Sun Kil Moon's follow-up album, Universal Themes (2015), primary recording artist Mark Kozelek again refers to his friendship with Gibbard on its closing track, "This Is My First Day and I'm Indian and I Work at a Gas Station". Gibbard previously made a guest appearance on the band's third studio album, April (2008).

Gibbard is also referenced in "The Cones of Dunshire", an episode from the sixth season of Parks and Recreation. In the episode, April (Aubrey Plaza) attempts to promote a forest cabin to hipsters by claiming that "Ben Gibbard and Neko Case made out here once."

Discography

Death Cab for Cutie

You Can Play These Songs with Chords (1997)
Something About Airplanes (1998)
We Have the Facts and We're Voting Yes (2000)
The Photo Album (2001)
Transatlanticism (2003)
Plans (2005)
Narrow Stairs (2008)
Codes and Keys (2011)
Kintsugi (2015)
Thank You for Today (2018)
Asphalt Meadows (2022)

Ben Gibbard
Home Volume V (split LP with Andrew Kenny, 2003)
"Couches In Alleys" (featured on Styrofoam's album Nothing's Lost, 2004)
Kurt Cobain About a Son: Original Score (with Steve Fisk, 2008)
Former Lives (2012)
Bandwagonesque (cover of Teenage Fanclub's album Bandwagonesque, 2017)
"Do You Remember" (featured on Chance the Rapper's album The Big Day, 2019)
"Me & Magdalena" (written by Gibbard for the Monkees' album Good Times!, 2016)
"Provider" (featured on the Chong the Nomad's EP A Long Walk, 2020)
"Every Beginning Ends" (featured on Noah Cyrus' album The Hardest Part, 2022)

The Postal Service

Give Up (2003)

¡All-Time Quarterback!
¡All-Time Quarterback! (EP, 1999)
The Envelope Sessions (1999)
¡All-Time Quarterback! (album, 1999)

Kind of Like Spitting
Bridges Worth Burning (drums, vocals, 2002)

American Analog Set
New Equation / All I Want For Christmas (7", backing vocals, 2001)

With Jay Farrar
One Fast Move or I'm Gone (2009)

Pinwheel
Pinwheel (1996)

See also 
Jason McGerr
Nick Harmer
Chris Walla

References

External links

Official site

20th-century American singers
21st-century American male actors
21st-century American singers
1976 births
Alternative rock guitarists
Alternative rock singers
American agnostics
American alternative rock musicians
American indie rock musicians
American male film actors
American male guitarists
American male singer-songwriters
American rock guitarists
American rock singers
American rock songwriters
Atlantic Records artists
Barsuk Records artists
Death Cab for Cutie members
Guitarists from Washington (state)
American LGBT rights activists
Living people
Pedro the Lion members
People from Bremerton, Washington
Singer-songwriters from Washington (state)
Sub Pop artists
The Minus 5 members
The Postal Service members
Western Washington University alumni